Zong Chen (Chinese:宗臣, Zōng Chén;1525–1560) was a major Chinese scholar-official of the Ming Dynasty.

Name variations
Zong is his family name, or surname. His given name is Chen. His courtesy name was Zǐ Xiàng. He may also be known by the pseudonym (hao), fāng Chéng Shān Rén.

Life 
The book, The Record of Xing Hua (兴化市志) remains the primary source of bibliographical material on Zong Chen. More sources include internal evidence from articles by or about Zong Chen, and other sources.

In 1525, Zong Chen was born in Xinghua. Disappointed with the corruption of the imperial government, Zong Chen resigned and went back to Xing hua in the year of 1552. He then spent considerable time on reading and writing. In 1560, Zong Chen died at the age of 36.

Works 
Zong Chen was a member of The Latter Seven Masters. At first, when began writing poems, he imitated the style of Li Bai, but failed. His main works include Letter To Liu Yizhang (报刘一丈书) and many poems.

Influence 
Zong Chen's moral as well as his articles have had an important influence on the Chinese culture.

External links 
 Stories of Zong Chen
 Reviews on Zong Chen's Letter to Liu Yizhang

1525 births
1560 deaths
Ming dynasty poets
Ming dynasty politicians
Writers from Taizhou, Jiangsu
Politicians from Taizhou, Jiangsu
Poets from Jiangsu